The Victorian Model Solar Vehicle Challenge is a competition held annually at Scienceworks in Melbourne, Australia.  The challenge gives school age children a chance to design and build a car or boat, and more recently a Mars Rover, that operates solely on solar power.  It is run by MSV, a voluntary organisation created to administer the challenge.

History 
A solar car challenge for schools' was first thought of in 1987 during the first World Solar Challenge.  Everyone who attended—car makers, staff and students from universities and secondary schools—believed it to be a great experience.  Two men, Paul Wellington (teacher at Chisholm Institute of Technology, part of Monash University), and Ted Mellor (Warragul Technical School), felt that such an opportunity should be available to a wider range of students, because at the time, the high cost of making a life-size solar car meant that only rich schools could afford it.  Thus, it was decided that a competition for model solar cars would be created; model cars being much cheaper and less time-consuming to make than life-size cars, but still requiring the same amount of thought and skill.  Paul and Ted assembled a team of science and technology teachers, curriculum developers, sponsors, representatives and former World Solar Challenge team members (today known as MSV), and with the financial support of Energy Victoria, they established a Model Solar Car Challenge in Victoria.  The first race was run in May 1990, at the Exhibition Buildings in Melbourne.

Sponsors 
The Sponsors of the event past and present are:
Deakin University
Intelematics
Swinburne University of Technology
Scienceworks Museum, who have hosted the event since 1991
City of Boroondara
Engineers Australia
Rotary Club of Balwyn

Additional information 
 Box Hill High School#Model Solar Car

External links 

Victorian MSV Challenge Website
 Croydon West Primary School Sheridan Challenge Winners of 2007
 Solarfreaks – Model Solar Cars 

Culture of Melbourne
Photovoltaics